WEC 15: Judgment Day was a mixed martial arts event promoted by World Extreme Cagefighting on May 19th 2005 at the Tachi Palace Hotel & Casino in Lemoore, California. The card featured the likes of Joe Riggs, Chris Lytle and James Irvin compete.

Results

See also 
 World Extreme Cagefighting
 List of World Extreme Cagefighting champions
 List of WEC events
 2005 in WEC

References

External links
 WEC 15 Results at Sherdog.com

World Extreme Cagefighting events
2005 in mixed martial arts
Mixed martial arts in California
Sports in Lemoore, California
2005 in sports in California